Ostrich stew is a stew prepared using ostrich meat as a primary ingredient. It is a part of South African cuisine, and is served in many places and restaurants in Oudtshoorn, South Africa. The meat can be diced into cubes, and leg meat from the ostrich is sometimes used. Additional ingredients can include vegetables such as onion, celery, carrots, tomatoes, soup stock and wine.

See also

 List of stews

References

South African stews
Poultry dishes
Ostriches
Wild game dishes